Frederick Mitcheson (20 March 1912 – 1994) was an English footballer who played at inside-forward.

Career
Mitcheson was on the books at Wolverhampton Wanderers before joining Port Vale in July 1933. He scored a hat-trick on his debut on 21 April 1934, a 4–0 win over Plymouth Argyle at The Old Recreation Ground, as the 1933–34 season drew to a close; scoring all three goals in just three minutes, this was the quickest hat-trick in the club's history. He scored four goals in 31 Second Division appearances in 1934–35. He hit just one goal in 15 games in 1935–36, before he was sold to Bob Jack's Plymouth Argyle in November 1935. He spent five years at Plymouth, scoring a hat-trick in January 1939 in a 4–3 win at Luton Town. After leaving Home Park he played for Ipswich Town and Yeovil Town. He returned to Plymouth Argyle in 1948 to help the training and ground staff.

Career statistics
Source:

References

1912 births
1994 deaths
Footballers from Newcastle upon Tyne
English footballers
Association football forwards
Wolverhampton Wanderers F.C. players
Port Vale F.C. players
Plymouth Argyle F.C. players
Ipswich Town F.C. players
Yeovil Town F.C. players
Doncaster Rovers F.C. wartime guest players
English Football League players
Plymouth Argyle F.C. non-playing staff